Yelena Davydovna Yarmak (born 6 July 1968 in Kyiv, Ukrainian Soviet Socialist Republic), known professionally as Helen Yarmak, is a Russian fashion designer and founder of the Helen Yarmak fashion house.

Background 
Early in life, Helen Yarmak studied as a mathematician at Taras Shevchenko University in Kyiv, earning the Doctor of Sciences title and academy seats in French Academy of Architecture and New York Academy of Sciences. However, after relocating to Moscow due to her husband's employment requirements, Yelena was practically starting her life anew.

Helen placed her first self-designed consignment order with the Moscow factory "Krasnaya Zarya", introducing herself as a non-existent Canadian firm representative. Even despite the fact that her fake identity was discovered soon after, the sketches turned out to be so good that the factory decided to move forward with the order.

Vogue magazine named Ms. Yarmak a "Mistress of a Sable Mountain" (Vogue, November 1998). Moreover, she was the first Russian designer whose collection appeared on a Vogue cover.

References

External links
 Official Helen Yarmak website
 Rambler

Living people
Businesspeople from Kyiv
1949 births
Russian fashion designers
Russian women fashion designers
Taras Shevchenko National University of Kyiv alumni
Ukrainian emigrants to Russia